Kremen may refer to:

Places
 Kremen, Blagoevgrad Province, a town of Bansko, Blagoevgrad Province, Bulgaria
 Kremen, Kardzhali Province, a village of Kirkovo, Kardzhali Province, Bulgaria
 Kremen, Krško, a settlement in Krško, Slovenia
 Donji Kremen (Lower Kremen), a village in Croatia
 Gornji Kremen (Upper Kremen), a village in Croatia

Other
Kremen (surname)
KREMEN1, a human gene
Kremen protein 1, the protein encoded by the KREMEN1 gene

See also

Kremin (disambiguation)